Zindler is a surname. Notable people with the surname include:

Frank Zindler (born 1939), American activist
Marvin Zindler (1921–2007), American reporter
Petra Zindler (born 1966), German swimmer
Randall Zindler, American businessman

See also
Windler